Out of Time may refer to:

Film 
 Out of Time (1988 film), a science fiction film starring Bill Maher
 Out of Time (2000 film), a television film directed by Ernest Thompson
 Out of Time (2003 film), a thriller starring Denzel Washington
 Out of Time (2004 film), a comedy short directed by Blake Ritson
 Out of Time (2007 film), an Austrian film named best documentary at the 2007 Seattle International Film Festival

Music 
 Out of Time (album), a 1991 album by R.E.M.
 "Out of Time" (Blur song), 2003
 "Out of Time" (Noel song), 1988
 "Out of Time" (Rolling Stones song)
 "Out of Time" (Stone Temple Pilots song), 2013
 "Out of Time", a 2018 song by Bradley Cooper from A Star Is Born
 "Out of Time" (The Weeknd song), a 2022 song by The Weeknd from Dawn FM

Television 
 "Out of Time" (CSI: Miami), a 2009 episode of CSI: Miami
"Out of Time" (Fantastic Four), an episode of Fantastic Four: World's Greatest Heroes "Out of Time" (Heroes), a 2007 episode of Heroes "Out of Time" (Legends of Tomorrow), a 2016 episode of Legends of Tomorrow "Out of Time" (Red Dwarf), a 1993 episode of Red Dwarf"Out of Time" (The Flash), a 2015 episode of The Flash "Out of Time" (Torchwood), a 2006 episode of Torchwood Other uses
 Out of Time (novel), a 1996 young-adult novel by Caroline B. Cooney
 MINERVA: Out of Time, the sequel mod to MINERVA: Metastasis''

See also 
Outta Time (disambiguation)
Out of Mind (disambiguation)